Ashton Golding (born 4 September 1996) is a Jamaica international rugby league rugby player who plays as a  for the Huddersfield Giants in the Betfred Super League.

Golding has previously played for the Leeds Rhinos in the Super League, and spent time on loan from Leeds at Featherstone Rovers in the Championship.

Early career
Golding was born in Bramley, Leeds, West Yorkshire, England. He is of Jamaican descent.

He previously played for amateur club Stanningley ARLFC.

Club career

Leeds
He made his début against London Broncos in 2013 and made sporadic appearances afterward.
At the start of the 2017 season Golding was given the number 1 jersey and played at fullback for most of the season until he lost his place to Jack Walker.

Bradford (loan)
On 26 May 2021, it was reported that he had signed for Bradford in the RFL Championship on loan.

Huddersfield
In 2020, Golding signed for Huddersfield.  On 28 May 2022, Golding played for Huddersfield in their 2022 Challenge Cup Final loss to Wigan.

International career
On 12 October 2017, Golding was named in Jamaica's squad to take on France in a World Cup warm up game. He scored a try on début.

References

External links
Leeds Rhinos profile
(archived by web.archive.org) Leeds Academy profile
SL profile
Jamaica profile

1996 births
Living people
Bradford Bulls players
English people of Jamaican descent
English rugby league players
Featherstone Rovers players
Huddersfield Giants players
Jamaica national rugby league team captains
Jamaica national rugby league team players
Jamaican rugby league players
Leeds Rhinos players
Rugby league fullbacks
Rugby league players from Bramley